The third season of ABC Family drama television series Switched at Birth began on January 13, 2014, and consists of 22 episodes. The season is produced by ABC Family, Pirates' Cove Entertainment, and Suzy B Productions, with Paul Stupin and series creator Lizzy Weiss serving as executive producers.

The one-hour scripted drama revolves around two young women who discover they were switched at birth and grew up in very different environments.  While balancing school, jobs, and their unconventional family, the girls, along with their friends and family, experience deaf culture, relationships, class differences, racism, audism, and other social issues.

Cast

Main
 Sean Berdy as Emmett Bledsoe
 Lucas Grabeel as Toby Kennish
 Katie Leclerc as Daphne Paloma Vasquez
 Vanessa Marano as Bay Madeleine Kennish
 Constance Marie as Regina Vasquez
 Gilles Marini as Angelo Sorrento
 D. W. Moffett as John Kennish
 Lea Thompson as Kathryn Kennish

Recurring

 Max Adler as Miles "Tank" Conroy
 Ryan Lane as Travis Barnes
Bianca Bethune as Sharee Gifford
 Kenneth Mitchell as Wes Gable
B.K. Cannon as Mary Beth Tucker
 RJ Mitte as Campbell Bingman
Daniel Durant as Matthew
 Marlee Matlin as Melody Bledsoe
 Stephanie Nogueras as Natalie Pierce
 Al White as Dr. Elroy Jackson
 David Castañeda as Jorge
 Alec Mapa as Renzo
 Ivonne Coll as Adrianna Vasquez
 Rachel Shenton as Lily Summers
 Sandra Bernhard as Teresa Ledarsky
Rene Moran as Nacho Rivera
Carlease Burke as Ms. Rose
 Cassi Thomson as Nikki Papagus
 Joey Lauren Adams as Jennice Papagus
Anthony Natale as Cameron Bledsoe
Matthew Risch as Chip Coto
 Kari Coleman as Whitney
 Erica Gimpel as Yvette Gifford
 Nathalia Ramos as Gretchen
Natalie Amenula as Monica
Suanne Spoke as Karen Barnes
Madison Saager as Heather
Jackie Debatin as Sarah Lazar
 Briana Lane as Christy Salz
 Sandra Purpuro as Anita
Stephanie Mieko Cohen as Darla
 Larry Sullivan as Leo
 Jill Remez as Juanita
 Nyle DiMarco as Garrett Banducci
Malana Lea as Jess
Laura Brown as Debbie
Iris Almario as Felicia

Episodes

Reception

U.S. ratings

References

2014 American television seasons
Switched at Birth (TV series)